Hierodula ventralis is a species of praying mantis in the family Mantidae.

References

ventralis
Articles created by Qbugbot
Insects described in 1912